The Kosovo Cup (in Albanian: Kupa e Kosovës) is an annual professional basketball competition between clubs from Kosovo. Founded in 1991, it is run by the Basketball Federation of Kosovo.

On group phase, teams are divided in four groups, winners are qualified in Final Four.

Competition finals

References

Basketball competitions in Kosovo
Basketball cup competitions in Europe